The 2017 FIM Women's Motocross World Championship was the 13th Women's Motocross World Championship season. Livia Lancelot was the defending champion, after taking her second title in 2016. Kiara Fontanesi won her fifth title this season.

2017 Calendar
A 6-round calendar for the 2017 season was announced on 15 October 2016.

Participants

Riders Championship

Manufacturers Championship

References 

Womens
Women's Motocross World Championship
Motocross